Heim is a surname. Notable people with the surname include:

Albert Heim (1849–1937), Swiss geologist
Aribert Heim (1914–1992), Austrian doctor and formerly one of the world's most wanted Nazi war criminals
Bruno Heim (1911–2003), Vatican's first Apostolic Nuncio to Great Britain
Burkhard Heim (1925–2001), German physicist
Corey Heim (born 2002), Racing Driver
Emmy Heim (1885–1954), Austrian/Canadian soprano singer
Ernst Ludwig Heim (1747–1834), German physician
Ferdinand Heim (1895–1977), German general (not to be confused with Aribert Ferdinand Heim)
François Joseph Heim (1787–1865), French painter
Irene Heim, American linguist, specialist in semantics
Jacques Heim (1899–1967), French (Parisian) designer and manufacturer
Jonah Heim, baseball player, catcher for the Oakland Athletics and Texas Rangers
Kay Heim (born 1917), Canadian-American professional baseball player
Scott Heim (born 1966), American novelist
Sverre Heim (born 1951), Norwegian physician and cancer researcher

Fictional characters:
Rick Heim, a correctional officer in the HBO drama Oz

See also
 Heym

German-language surnames